BLITS  (Ball Lens In The Space) is a Russian satellite launched on September 17, 2009, as a secondary payload on a Soyuz-2.1b/Fregat, from the Baikonur Cosmodrome in Kazakhstan.
The satellite is totally passive and spherical, and is tracked using satellite laser ranging (SLR) by the International Laser Ranging Service.  The design of BLITS is based on the optical Luneburg lens concept. The retroreflector is a multilayer glass sphere; it provides uniform reflection characteristics when viewed within a very wide range of angles, and can provide a cross-section sufficient for observations at low to medium orbit heights.  A similar design was already tested on a smaller laser reflector carried on board of the METEOR-3M spacecraft launched on December 10, 2001.

The purpose of the mission was to validate the spherical glass retroreflector satellite concept and obtain SLR (Satellite Laser Ranging) data for solution of scientific problems in geophysics, geodynamics, and relativity. The BLITS allows millimeter and submillimeter accuracy SLR measurements, as its "target error" (uncertainty of reflection center relative to its center of mass) is less than 0.1 mm.  An additional advantage is that the Earth's magnetic field does not affect the satellite orbit and spin parameters, unlike retroreflectors incorporated into active satellites.  The BLITS allows the most accurate measurements of any SLR satellites, with the same accuracy level as a ground target.

The satellite was inserted into an  Sun-synchronous orbit, with an inclination of 98.85º. The satellite was spinning at a spin period of 5.6 seconds  around the axis normal to its orbit plane, allowing laser light to be reflected in short bursts because only half of the satellite is covered in a reflective coating. As the satellite is made of glass, minimal in-flight spin slowdown was expected since there were no conducting parts where currents interacting with the Earth magnetic field can be induced.
The expected operative life was at least five years, but the mission was interrupted in 2013 after a collision with space debris.

Structure 
The satellite body consists of two outer hemispheres (radius ) made of a low-refraction-index glass and an inner ball lens (radius ) made of a high-refraction-index glass; the two outer hemispheres and the inner ball are glued together, and one of the outer hemispheres is externally coated with a reflective coating, covered with a protective varnish.

It is made with two hemispherical shells (outer radius ) of low refractive index glass (n = 1.47), and an inner sphere or ball lens (radius ) made of a high refractive index glass (n = 1.76). The hemispheres are glued over the ball lens with all spherical surfaces concentric; the external surface of one hemisphere is coated with aluminum and protected by a varnish layer. It was designed for ranging with a green (532 nm) laser. When used for ranging, the phase center is  behind the sphere center, with a range correction of + taking into account the indices of refraction. A smaller spherical retroreflector of the same type but 6 cm in diameter was fastened to the Meteor-3M spacecraft and tested during its space flight of 2001–2006.

Collision 
In early 2013, the satellite was found to have a new orbit  lower, a faster spin period of 2.1 seconds, and a different spin axis.

On January 28, 2013, the International Laser Ranging Service announced that a collision happened between BLITS and a space debris fragment. As a result, an abrupt change occurred of the BLITS orbit parameters (a decrease of the orbiting period), and the spin period changed from 5.6 s before collision to 2.1 s after collision. On April 19, 2013, BLITS mission contacts from the Scientific Research Institute for Precision Instrument Engineering in Moscow asked the ILRS to end tracking on the satellite.
According to the simulation by the  Center for Space Standards & Innovation (CSSI), a research arm of Analytical Graphics, Inc. (AGI), BLITS could have been hit by a piece of debris originated by the 2007 Chinese anti-satellite missile test.

Last science data was returned from the satellite on 5 March 2013.

New version 
An improved version of the reflector, named BLITS-M, launched 26 December 2019 with a Gonets-M mission on a Rokot rocket. BLITS-M failed to separate from the upper stage; thus the mission was a failure.

References

Spacecraft launched in 2009
Laser ranging satellites
Satellite collisions
Spacecraft launched by Soyuz-2 rockets
Technology demonstration satellites